Nepal Post is the Postal Services Department of the Nepali Ministry of Information and Communications and the national post office of Nepal. Nepal Post became a member of the Universal Postal Union on 11 October 1956.

Services
There are four main central offices of the postal department viz. Goswwara office, Central Dhanades Office, Philatelic and postage management office and a Training center. It has regional office in Biratnagar, Pokhara, Surkhet and Doti. There are 70 district offices and 842 city post offices and 3074 small post offices run by the department.  Nepal Post also has participation with the EMS system.

See also
Postage stamps and postal history of Nepal

References

External links

Philately of Nepal
Postal system of Nepal
Government agencies of Nepal
Postal organizations